Duggan was a TVNZ police drama from 1997, featuring New Zealand actor John Bach as Detective Inspector John Duggan and Fiona Mogridge as Ruth Duggan. Unlike other New Zealand police drama series, Duggan was initially intended to be produced as a series of one-off programmes, akin to British crime series of the time such as Inspector Morse and Midsomer Murders. Two stories were filmed in this way, one each in 1997 and 1998, before the decision was made to produce a series of 11 episodes in 1999. All episodes except for the first two were one hour in length; the first two were two hours long.

Premise
Duggan follows the investigations of John Duggan, an initially retired Police Detective Inspector who becomes involved in various murder investigations near his home in the Marlborough Sounds at the top of the South Island of New Zealand. As such, the show mainly takes place in the Sounds, Picton and Wellington.

Having retired from his job after the death of his wife, he is initially reluctant to resume his police work. However he is convinced back in the first telefeature, Death in Paradise. Through the show he works to uncover complex murder plots against the backdrop of small-town New Zealand in the late 1990s.

Ironically, production of the series was briefly delayed by a major real-life crime, the 1998 New Years Day murder of Ben Smart and Olivia Hope.

List of episodes

Introductory episodes

Season 1 (1999)

References

External links

Duggan at nzonscreen.com

1997 New Zealand television series debuts
1999 New Zealand television series endings
1990s New Zealand television series
Detective television series
English-language television shows
New Zealand drama television series
TVNZ 1 original programming
Television shows funded by NZ on Air
Television shows set in New Zealand
Marlborough Sounds